Elk Hill, also known as Harrison's Elk Hill, is a historic plantation home located near Goochland, Goochland County, Virginia.  It was built between 1835 and 1839, and is a -story, three-bay, stuccoed brick central-hall-plan house in the Greek Revival style. It has a two-story rear ell. The front facade features a one-story Tuscan order portico consisting of paired rectangular wooden pillars supporting a full entablature. Also on the property are the contributing servants' quarters (some former slave quarters), tack house, and spring house. It was listed on the National Register of Historic Places in 1979.

Elk Hill Farm
The Elk Hill children and family services organization was founded in 1970 when the Scott family decided to provide a steady, stable home for young men at the former Elk Hill plantation site. It was the first of six locations established in Virginia since 1970. Today the property is used by a residential program for young men, called Elk Hill Farm. The house retains the original plan and the school farms the land.

Geography
The 35-acre Elk Hill property is located East of Elk Island and .8 miles east of James River and 1700 feet south of State Route 608. It is about 1.3 miles southwest of thee intersection of State Routes 608 and 6 and about 2.1 miles southwest of George's Tavern, a crossroads settlement named for the former tavern and inn established for travelers.

It is much smaller than the original Elk Hill plantation. Now, the land includes most of the hill that the house sits on. It is bounded by the contours of the hill on the north and south side of the property, partially by a drive on the east side, and the Chesapeake and Ohio Railway tracks on the western border of the property. It has a clear view of the James River.

History

Elk Hill was a plantation located at the mouth of Byrd Creek and near Elk Island. John Woodson acquired a land patent in 1714 for property that included Elk Hill. It was purchased in 1746 by John Wayles, the father of Martha Wayles Skelton Jefferson. His daughter and her first husband, Bathurst Skelton, lived at Elk Hill during the two-year marriage that began in November 1766 and ended with his death in 1768. Three hundred acres of Elk Hill was a component of the dowry for the marriage between Martha and Thomas Jefferson. The couple attained additional property following Wayles’ death in May 1773. Jefferson purchased additional adjacent property by May 1783. In 1799, Jefferson sold Elk Hill with 669 acres to Thomas Augustus Taylor of Chesterfield County.

After a number of sales, Elk Hill was sold in 1832 to Randolph Harrison for his son Randolph Harrison, Jr. Randolph Harrison was a relative of Thomas Jefferson. Randolph Harrison, Jr. who made a fortune on the tobacco trade, spent $15,000 to build the house. The Elk Hill house was situated on a hill overlooking James River and near the confluence with Byrd Creek. It was likely a frame house.

Later owner, Henningham Carrington Harrison operated a mill on Byrd Creek at Elk Hill about 1850. It was the largest of 20 mills in Goochland. Harrison operated both a grain mill and sawmill. The plantation conveyed their products to Richmond via canal boats and, beginning in the late 19th century, via railroad trains. Elk Hill was one of the railroad stops. S. Buford Scott became the owner of Elk Hill in 1943. A stockbroker from Richmond, Scott used Elk Hill as a country home.

Revolutionary War
During the Revolutionary War, Elkhill was occupied by Lord Cornwallis and his men for ten days, during which time they destroyed many of the crops on the plantation and slaughtered livestock for provisions. Jefferson visited the site not long after Cornwallis left, and later recorded what he had seen in a letter to William Gordon in Paris.

Civil War
Elk Hill was plundered during the Civil War. Food and furnishings were removed from the house and some furnishings were destroyed.

Economic transition
Farmland has been sold and repurposed for commercial and residential development.

Notes

References

External links
 
 

Houses on the National Register of Historic Places in Virginia
Greek Revival houses in Virginia
Houses completed in 1839
Houses in Goochland County, Virginia
National Register of Historic Places in Goochland County, Virginia